Brightlight Pictures Inc. is a Canadian film production and television production company based in Vancouver, British Columbia, Canada.

History

Shawn Williamson is the chairman of Brightlight Pictures. Williamson has produced more than 90 productions in the last 15 years and over 35 productions since launching Brightlight in 2001, such as White Noise starring Michael Keaton, which has grossed over $100 million since its worldwide theatrical release in 2005.

Brightlight has worked on films with Inferno Picture Pictures, Baldwin Entertainment, Gold Circle Films, and Universal Studios, and has been credited for work for CBC Television, Hallmark Channel, Mandate Pictures, Lionsgate Films, Nu Image/Millenium Films, Emmett/Furla/Oasis Films, The Weinstein Company, and Yari Film Group.

Brightlight's television credits include the TV series Saved for TNT and Fox 21 and About a Girl for MTV's TeenNick Network and Global Television. Brightlight also produced the CTV/Space Channel series Stormworld, an Australian/Singaporean/Canadian Treaty co-production shot in Perth, Broome, Singapore and Vancouver.

Brightlight's UK/Canada feature co-production Fifty Dead Men Walking starring Ben Kingsley, Jim Sturgess and Kevin Zegers had its world premiere as a Gala Presentation at the Toronto International Film Festival in September 2008 and was released theatrically in the summer of 2009. Brightlight also produced Frankie & Alice starring Halle Berry and Stellan Skarsgård and the feature film Gunless, a comedy western co-produced with Niv Fichman's Rhombus Media and distributed by Alliance Films starring Paul Gross, Sienna Guillory and Graham Greene.

Brightlight Pictures productions

References

External links
 Brightlight Pictures official website

 
Film distributors of Canada
Film production companies of Canada
Television production companies of Canada
Companies based in Vancouver
Entertainment companies established in 2001